Taurolema cicatricosa is a species of beetle in the family Cerambycidae. It was described by Lane in 1966. It is known from Guyana, French Guiana, and Brazil.

References

Mauesiini
Beetles described in 1966